Aliabad-e Gachi (also Romanized as ‘Alīābād-e Gachī; also known as ‘Alīābād and ‘Alīābād-e Gachchī) is a village in Musaabad Rural District, in the Central District of Dehaqan County, Isfahan Province, Iran. At the 2006 census, its population was 393, in 125 families.

References 

Populated places in Dehaqan County